Vincent Edwards "Vince" Phillips (born July 23, 1963) is an American former professional boxer who competed from 1989 to 2007. He held the IBF junior welterweight title from 1997 to 1999, notably scoring an upset victory against then-undefeated Kostya Tszyu to become champion.

Amateur career
As an amateur, Phillips won the U.S. National Golden Gloves in 1985, and the U.S. National Championships in 1985 and 1986, all in the lightweight division.

Professional career
Phillips made his professional debut on February 28, 1989, stopping Octavio Guardado in two rounds. He would win his next 27 fights until losing to Anthony Jones November 18, 1993, due to cuts in the seventh round. On April 12, 1996, Phillips made his first world title challenge by facing WBA welterweight champion Ike Quartey, but was stopped in three rounds. A year later, on May 31, 1997, he scored a major upset by defeating then-unbeaten world champion Kostya Tszyu to win the IBF junior welterweight title, which was named the Upset of the Year by The Ring magazine. Phillips made three successful title defenses throughout 1997 and 1998, until a fifth-round stoppage loss to Terron Millett on February 20, 1999. He would fight for another eight years, albeit never again for a world title, and ended his career with a ten-round unanimous decision loss to Alisultan Nadirbegov on May 6, 2007.

Professional boxing record

References

External links

Vince Phillips K-1 kickboxing record

1963 births
Boxers from Florida
Light-welterweight boxers
American male kickboxers
Kickboxers from Florida
Welterweight kickboxers
International Boxing Federation champions
Living people
Winners of the United States Championship for amateur boxers
American male boxers
Welterweight boxers
Light-middleweight boxers
World light-welterweight boxing champions
National Golden Gloves champions
Lightweight boxers